Zavetinsky District is an administrative and municipal district (raion), one of the forty-three in Rostov Oblast, Russia. Its administrative center is the rural locality (a selo) of Zavetnoye. Population: 17,250 (2010 Census);  The population of Zavetnoye accounts for 41.0% of the district's total population.

Geography
The district is located in the southeast of the oblast. The Yergeni hills rise to the east.

References

Notes

Sources

Districts of Rostov Oblast